Cha Hyung-won (September 5, 1890 – July 2, 1972), was designated as Ingan-munhwage on 16 January 1967 for the Gangneung Danoje festival, which is one of the Important Intangible Cultural Properties of Korea. He was specialized in Gwanno-Masque playing, a kind of pantomime. It was a satire of the caste system by members of the gwanno class.

Biography
Cha was born on 5 September 1890 in Gangneung, Korea. His father, Cha In-sil, lived in 132 dong Gangneung Seongnamdong. When he was 17 years old, he saw the last gwanno-Masque playing at the Gangneung Danoje festival in 1907 before it disappeared  in the latter era of the Choson Dynasty. As the gwanno-Masque playing was performed by gwanno, a man slave in government employ, Cha denied that he was gwanno. After the Gwanno-Masque playing was designated as the Important Intangible Cultural Properties of Korea on 16 January 1967, it was reconstructed by researchers. Cha was one of the masters who participated in organizing all of the information about Gwanno-Masque playing from the appearance of masque to performance. He died in on 2 July 1972.

Career
He actually worked as Gwanno at the Gwannocheong in Gangneung province until the latter era of Joseon Dynasty and he made the masque and had performance in the Gangneung Danohje. He participated historical research about Gwanno-Masque playing since 1966 for restoration of the masque and organization of playing.

References

External links
Local culture of Gangneung
 Korean Cultural Heritage Association

South Korean male stage actors
1972 deaths
1890 births
People from Gangneung